Kunala Stupa is a Kushan-era Buddhist stupa and monastery complex to the south-east of Taxila, on a hill about 200 meters just south of Sirkap, Punjab, Pakistan, thought to date to the 2nd century CE. It is located on a hill overlooking the ancient Indo-Greek city of Sirkap.

Its name come from Kunala, a son of Ashoka. Kunala, the legitimate heir to the throne had been blinded by one of Ashoka's queens, Tishyaksha, due to jealousy for his beautiful eyes. After years of wandering, Kunala reunited with his father Ashoka, and was treated by a doctor from Taxila.

Buddhist pilgrims with eye impairment came to the stupa with the hope of being cured.

The Kunala stupa was visited by the Chinese pilgrim Xuanzang, who wrote an account of it.

References

Archaeological sites in Punjab, Pakistan
Buddhist monasteries in Pakistan
Stupas in Pakistan
Taxila Tehsil
Buddhist sites in Pakistan
2nd-century Buddhism
2nd-century religious buildings and structures